Nehe is a county-level city of western Heilongjiang in Northeast China, It is located near the border with Inner Mongolia to the west and is under the administration of Qiqihar City,  to the north-northeast.

Administrative divisions 
Nehe City is divided into 2 subdistricts, 11 towns, 3 townships and 1 ethnic township. 
2 subdistricts
 Yuting, Tongjiang
11 towns
 Laha, Erkeqian, Xuetian, Longhe, Nenan, Liuhe, Zhangfa, Tongnan, Tongyi, Jiujing, Laolai
3 townships
 Kongguo, Hesheng, Tongxin
1 ethnic township
 Xingwang Ewenki

Climate

References

External links
Official website of Nehe Government

Cities in Heilongjiang
Districts of Qiqihar